Strong's Block is a historic commercial building at 1637–1651 Beacon Street in the center of Waban Village, in the city of Newton, Massachusetts.  Built in 1896, this -story brick Flemish Revival structure is one of a small number of surviving 19th century commercial blocks in the city.  The building was designed by Waban resident Lewis H. Bacon for William Strong, another local resident, who sought to capitalize on the construction of the nearby Circuit Railroad (now the MBTA Green Line D branch).

The building was listed on the National Register of Historic Places in 1986.

See also
 National Register of Historic Places listings in Newton, Massachusetts

References

National Register of Historic Places in Newton, Massachusetts
Commercial blocks on the National Register of Historic Places in Massachusetts
Colonial Revival architecture in Massachusetts
Commercial buildings completed in 1896
Buildings and structures in Newton, Massachusetts